The USC Wrigley Institute for Environmental Studies is an environmental research and education facility run by the University of Southern California.  It is an organized research unit that encompasses a wide range of faculty and topics across the university as well as operating a marine laboratory at the edge of Two Harbors, California on Catalina Island approximately 22 miles (35 km) south-southwest of Los Angeles.

The USC Wrigley Institute has specialized programs in environmental microbiology, geobiology, ocean biogeochemistry, living marine resources (including fisheries and aquaculture), climate change, coastal environmental quality and the urban ocean.  The Institute is also home to the USC Sea Grant Program, part of the National Sea Grant Program through the National Oceanic and Atmospheric Administration.

History of the Wrigley Institute
USC established the Philip K. Wrigley Marine Science Center on the island at Big Fisherman's Cove following a grant of more than 14 acres of land from the families of Philip Wrigley and Paxson Offield. In 1995, William and Julie Wrigley continued their family legacy by providing USC with the capital to initiate the Wrigley Institute for Environmental Studies. Their gift provided for an endowed directorship, an endowed chair and the renovation of the Wrigley Marine Science Center. Today, the USC research complex on Catalina Island is the centerpiece of the Wrigley Institute, with additional staff and offices on the University of Southern California's University Park Campus in downtown Los Angeles.

In addition, USC administers the Tyler Prize for Environmental Achievement. USC also manages the USC Sea Grant Program, a federally funded program of research, education and outreach. The Sea Grant program at USC places special emphasis on the "urban ocean."

Current leadership and initiatives

The Wrigley Institute of Environmental Studies is currently led by Interim Director Dr. John Heidelberg. Early in his career, Dr. Heidelberg led the collaboration to sequence the genome of Vibrio cholerae, the bacterium that causes cholera, one of humanity's most ancient and deadly scourges. He was later a fundamental team member in the development of shotgun metagenomics sequencing technologies used throughout the world’s oceans. He continues to develop and employ novel sequencing methodologies, contributing to fundamental discoveries about the nature and properties of microbial life in the sea. 

Currently, Heidelberg and his staff are focusing research on healthy oceans, coastal megacities, and sustainable solutions. A primary goal is to use the Wrigley Marine Science Center on Catalina Island to become a testbed for sustainable solutions. Signature programs include the San Pedro Ocean Time-Series monitoring program in the waters off the coast of Los Angeles, kelp biodiesel research, sustainable aquaculture, graduate fellowships and a premier scientific diving program.

Past leadership 
Since the founding of the Wrigley Institute in 1995, past leadership has included: 

 Dr. Anthony "Tony" Michaels
 Dr. Donal Monahan
 Dr. Roberta Marinelli
 Dr. Ken Nealson

USC Wrigley Marine Science Center 
The Wrigley Institute manages the USC Wrigley Marine Science Center, located on the West End of Catalina Island and bordering the Blue Cavern State Marine Conservation Area. 

USC provides daily weekday boat transportation for the USC community to the Catalina facility from the Southern California Marine Institute on Terminal Island.

USC Wrigley Sustainability Prize 
The institute launched a pitch competition in 2017 for sustainable businesses called the USC Wrigley Sustainability Prize. The event highlights innovative start-up ideas from all disciplines and rewards concepts that could result in meaningful environmental change. Winning teams receive prize money to help translate their ideas into action. Past student businesses have included:

 Catapower creates renewable biofuel and plastic from vegetable oil and won the 2018 prize
 Apeiron creates graphene by retrofitting power plants
 Interphase increases energy efficiency for power plants
Closed Composites - recycles the carbon fiber from airplanes and won the 2019 prize

Catalina Hyperbaric Chamber 
Based at the USC Wrigley Marine Science Center, the USC Catalina Hyperbaric Chamber is an emergency medical facility on Catalina Island for the treatment of scuba diving accidents. The chamber facilities are on the waterfront of the Wrigley Marine Science Center and adjacent to a helipad that is licensed for day or night helicopter landings. The chamber itself is large enough to treat several patients at once and provides enough room for staff and volunteers to perform cardiopulmonary resuscitation (CPR) and advanced life support for patients who arrive in cardiac arrest. 

The Catalina Chamber Crew works closely with the Los Angeles County Medical Alert Center (MAC) and operates as an extension of the Los Angeles County-USC Medical Center Department of Emergency Medicine. The chamber is managed by a fulltime member of the USC Wrigley Marine Science Center, and it is staffed all day, every day, by a rotating team of trained volunteers. Financial support comes from Los Angeles County; from donations by individual contributors, dive clubs and dive boat operators, and from special fund raising events.

Wrigley Advisory Board members 
The advisory board has 21 members, including Wrigley family members.

 Phil Hagenah (chair) 
 Terry Adams - Director, Executive Vice President of SA Recycling
 Todd Bauer - Executive Vice President, Guardian Group
 Tony Budrovich - President and CEO of the Catalina Island Conservancy
 Brock Dewey - Vice President, Dewey Pest Control
 Len Fein
 Lynda Boone Fetter - Principal, Samuelson and Fetter, LLC.
 Bruce Kessler
 Sam King - President and CEO of King's Seafood Company
 Bob McKnight - CEO, Chairman, Quiksilver
 Diane Sonosky Montgomery 
 Breene Murphy - Director of Client Experience, EP Wealth Advisors
 Calen Offield - Director, Wrigley Investments
 Maria Pellegrini - Executive Director, W.M. Keck Foundation
 Allison Wrigley Rusack - Vintner, Rusack Vineyards
 Stephen Scully - former Founder and President, Scully Companies
 Dan Zinsmeyer
 Julie Wrigley - President and CEO, Wrigley Investments

References

External links 
USC Wrigley Institute website

Wrigley Institute for Environmental Studies
Wrigley Institute for Environmental Studies
Wrigley Institute for Environmental Studies|Wrigley Institute for Environmental Studies
Wrigley family
Science and technology in Greater Los Angeles